

Richard Pellengahr (19 August 1883 – 9 October 1964) was a German general (Generalleutnant) in the Wehrmacht during World War II. He was a recipient of the Knight's Cross of the Iron Cross of Nazi Germany.

Awards

 Knight's Cross of the Iron Cross on 9 May 1940 as Generalleutnant and commander of the 196. Infanterie-Division

References

Citations

Bibliography

 

1883 births
1964 deaths
German Army personnel of World War I
Reichswehr personnel
Lieutenant generals of the German Army (Wehrmacht)
People from the Province of Westphalia
Recipients of the Knight's Cross of the Iron Cross
Recipients of the clasp to the Iron Cross, 1st class
People from Gütersloh (district)
Military personnel from North Rhine-Westphalia
German Army generals of World War II